Brandon Daniels (born March 10, 1978) is a former American football wide receiver in the Arena Football League who played for the Austin Wranglers. He played college football for the Oklahoma Sooners.

Daniels played quarterback, running back and wide receiver at Oklahoma.

References

1978 births
Living people
American football wide receivers
American football running backs
American football quarterbacks
Austin Wranglers players
Oklahoma Sooners football players